Punang Terusan is a town or settlement in Sarawak, Malaysia.

Nearby towns and villages include Long Buang (9.9 nm north), Pa Brayong (11.7 nm north), Long Semado (2.8 nm south), Long Kinoman (1.0 nm south), Long Pa Sia (9.2 nm east), and Long Lapukan (5.1 nm west).

References

External links
Information at the Traveling Luck World Index
Information at Maplandia.com

Towns in Sarawak